
The American Creed is a term used to refer to the idea that the defining element of American identity, first formulated by Thomas Jefferson and elaborated by many others, includes liberty, equality, justice, and humanity.  Not to be confused with Dean Alfange's "An American's Creed".

The American's Creed (resolution) 

"The American's Creed" is the title of a resolution passed by the U.S. House of Representatives on April 3, 1918. It is a statement written in 1917 by William Tyler Page as an entry into a patriotic contest that he won.

See also

 List of U.S. national symbols
 American civil religion
 American exceptionalism
 American nationalism
 Americanism (ideology)

References

Further reading
 Murdock, Myrtle Cheney (1958), The American's Creed and William Tyler Page, Monumental Press. 
 Page, William Tyler (1921),  The Book of the American's Creed, Sons of the American Revolution: The Country Life Press. 

American nationalism
National symbols of the United States
Oaths
1917 documents